Ağılözü can refer to:

 Ağılözü, Erzincan
 Ağılözü, Kurşunlu